
Przeworsk County is a unit of territorial administration and local government (powiat) in Subcarpathian Voivodeship, south-eastern Poland. It came into being on January 1, 1999, as a result of the Polish local government reforms passed in 1998.

As of 2019 its total population is 78,354, out of which the population of Przeworsk is 15,356, that of Kańczuga is 3,167, that of Sieniawa is 2,140, and the rural population is 57,691.

Neighbouring counties
Przeworsk County is bordered by Biłgoraj County to the north, Lubaczów County and Jarosław County to the east, Przemyśl County to the south, Rzeszów County to the south-west, and Łańcut County and Leżajsk County to the west.

Administrative division
The county is subdivided into nine gminas (one urban, two urban-rural and six rural). These are listed in the following table, in descending order of population.

References

 
Przeworsk